Best: Fan's Selection is a compilation album by Japanese heavy metal band X Japan, released on December 19, 2001. It contains songs selected by fans at an online poll, in order of voting. The album reached number 13 on the Oricon chart.

Although there is no description in particular, all tracks are remastered for this album, by Bill Dooley who has engineered Judas Priest album “Turbo”.

Track listing

References 

X Japan compilation albums
2001 compilation albums